The 2022 South Carolina gubernatorial election took place on November 8, 2022, to elect the governor of South Carolina. Incumbent Republican Governor Henry McMaster ran for re-election for a second full term in office and secured the Republican nomination in the June 14 primary. Joe Cunningham, former United States Representative from South Carolina's 1st congressional district, was the Democratic nominee. McMaster won the general election with 58% of the vote — a larger margin than in 2018.

This election marks the largest gubernatorial victory in the state since 1990, when incumbent Republican Carroll Campbell won his re-election bid by a margin of 41.7%.

Republican primary

Candidates

Declared
Henry McMaster, incumbent governor
Running mate: Pamela Evette, incumbent lieutenant governor

Eliminated in primary
Harrison "Trucker Bob" Musselwhite, trucker and Chairman of Legislate Liaison Committee for the Greenville County Republican Party
Running mate: Zoe Warren, filmmaker and editor-at-large for The Standard SC

Withdrew
Al Bellavance, former Fort Lawn town councilor
Mindy L. Steele, political consultant

Declined
A. Shane Massey, Majority Leader of the South Carolina Senate
Tim Scott, U.S. Senator (ran for re-election)
Katrina Shealy, state senator
John Warren, Greenville businessman and candidate for governor in 2018

Endorsements

Results

Democratic primary

Candidates

Nominee
Joe Cunningham, former U.S. Representative for

Eliminated in primary
Carlton Boyd
Mia McLeod, state senator
Calvin "CJ Mack" McMillan, singer

Withdrew
Gary Votour, healthcare advocate and retired GIS mapper (running under Labor nomination)

Declined
Stephen K. Benjamin, former Mayor of Columbia
Mandy Powers Norrell, former state representative and nominee for lieutenant governor in 2018 (endorsed McLeod)
Todd Rutherford, Minority Leader of the South Carolina House of Representatives

Endorsements

Results

Lieutenant governor selection
After winning the primary, on July 18, Cunningham released a shortlist of potential running mates. He announced Tally Parham Casey as his running mate on August 1.

Chosen as running mate
Tally Parham Casey, law firm CEO and former South Carolina Air National Guard fighter pilot

Made shortlist
Rosalyn Glenn, financial planner and nominee for South Carolina State Treasurer in 2018
Jermaine Johnson, state representative
Kimberly Johnson, state representative
Meghan Smith, Spartanburg city councillor
Ed Sutton, real estate agent and U.S. Air Force pilot
Spencer Wetmore, state representative
Kathryn Whitaker, law firm chief marketing officer

Declined
Mia McLeod, state senator and runner-up in the gubernatorial primary
Teresa Wilson, Columbia city manager

Independence primary

Candidates

Declared
Jokie Beckett Jr., veteran
Michael Copeland

Results

Independents and third parties

Candidates

Declared
Morgan Bruce Reeves (Libertarian), United Citizens and Green nominee for governor in 2010 and United Citizens nominee in 2014
Jessica Ethridge, vice chair of South Carolina Libertarian Party
Gary Votour (Labor), healthcare advocate and retired GIS mapper  Labor Party candidates names kept off the ballot after Court ruling.
Running mate: Harold Geddings III, candidate for South Carolina's 2nd congressional district in 2014

General election

Predictions

Endorsements

Polling
Graphical summary

Debates and forums

Results

See also 
 2022 South Carolina elections

Notes

Partisan clients

References

External links 
Official campaign websites
 Joe Cunningham (D) for Governor
 Henry McMaster (R) for Governor
 Bruce Reeves (L) for Governor
 Gary Votour (Labor) for Governor

2022
South Carolina
Gubernatorial